José Martínez may refer to:

Religion
 José Antonio Martínez de Aldunate (1731–1811), Chilean bishop and government member
 Antonio José Martínez (1793–1867), New Mexico Catholic priest
 José O'Callaghan Martínez (1922–2001), Spanish Jesuit Catholic priest, papyrologist, and biblical scholar

Sports

Baseball
 José Martínez (infielder/coach) (1942–2014), Cuban infielder, coach, and executive in Major League Baseball
 José Martínez (pitcher) (born 1971), Dominican pitcher in Major League Baseball
 José Martínez (outfielder/first baseman) (born 1988), Venezuelan infielder/outfielder in Major League baseball

Football
 José Martínez Sánchez (born 1941), better known as Pirri, Spanish football player
 José María Martínez (footballer) (born 1947), Argentine footballer
 Chepe Martínez (born 1979), Salvadoran footballer who plays for Chalatenango
 José Guadalupe Martínez (born 1983), Mexican goalkeeper for Puebla F.C.
 José Martínez (footballer, born 1983) (born 1983), Spanish football player
 José Joaquín Martínez (born 1987), soccer player that plays for Club América
 José Martínez (footballer, born 1991) (born 1991), Chilean footballer who for Universidad Católica
 José Hernández (footballer, born 1994) (born 1994), Mexican footballer
 José Andrés Martínez (born 1994) Venezuelan, currently with Philadelphia Union
 José Martínez Marsà (born 2002), Spanish football defender
 José Carlos Martínez (footballer), Guatemalan footballer

Water sports
 José Martínez (rowing) (1895–1971), Spanish coxswain
 José Martínez (Cuban swimmer) (born 1952), Cuban swimmer
 José María Martínez (canoeist) (born 1968), Spanish slalom canoer
 José Martínez (canoeist) (born 1973), Mexican sprint canoer
 José Ángel Martínez (born 1997), Mexican swimmer

Other sports
 José Martínez (athlete) (1901–?), Mexican Olympic sprinter
 Jose Martinez (boxer) (born 1951), Canadian Olympic boxer
 Jose Martinez-Zorilla (1912–1989), Mexican Olympic fencer
 José Martínez (volleyball) (born 1993), Mexican international volleyball player
 José Martínez (weightlifter) (born 1950), Colombian Olympic weightlifter
 José Alberto Martínez (born 1975), Spanish professional road bicycle racer
 Jose Eduardo Martinez Alcantara (born 1999), Peruvian chess player
 José Manuel Martínez (athlete) (born 1971), Spanish long-distance runner
 José Martínez Morote (born 1984), Spanish athlete
 Maria José Martínez-Patiño (born 1961), Spanish hurdler, competed as woman but was declared a man

Other
 Esteban José Martínez Fernández y Martínez de la Sierra (1742–1798), Spanish explorer of the Pacific Northwest
 José Longinos Martínez (fl. 1792), Spanish naturalist
 José Martínez Ruiz (1873–1967), Spanish poet and writer
 Jose E. Martinez (born 1941), American lawyer and judge
 José Carlos Martínez (politician) (1962–2011), Argentine politician
 José Carlos Martínez (dancer) (born 1969), Spanish dancer
 José Martínez (singer) (active since 1997), singer in C-Note
 José Manuel Martínez (serial killer) (born 1962), former self-described Mexican drug cartel hitman

See also
José Luis Martínez (disambiguation)
José Antonio Martínez (disambiguation)